Orgas is an unincorporated community in Boone County, West Virginia, United States. Orgas has a post office with ZIP code 25148. Orgas was named after the Orange Gas Coal Company which was established in 1919.

References

Unincorporated communities in Boone County, West Virginia
Unincorporated communities in West Virginia
Coal towns in West Virginia